Fairfaxia is a genus of trematodes in the family Opecoelidae.

Species
Fairfaxia cribbi Hassanine & Gibson, 2005
Fairfaxia lethrini Cribb, 1989

References

Opecoelidae
Plagiorchiida genera